In mathematics, Grothendieck's connectedness theorem ,  states that if A is a complete Noetherian local ring whose spectrum is k-connected and f is in the maximal ideal, then Spec(A/fA) is (k − 1)-connected. Here a Noetherian scheme is called k-connected if its dimension is greater than k and the complement of every closed subset of dimension less than k is connected.

It is a local analogue of Bertini's theorem.

See also
Zariski connectedness theorem
Fulton–Hansen connectedness theorem

References

Bibliography

Theorems in algebraic geometry